Professor Paul Waako (born 20 February 1967), is a Ugandan pharmacologist, academic and academic administrator, who serves as the Vice Chancellor of Busitema University, a public university in the Eastern Region of Uganda, since 1 May 2019.

Background and education
Waako was born on 20 February 1967 at Mukuta Village, in Mayuge District, in the Eastern Region of Uganda. After attending local primary and secondary schools, he was admitted to Makerere University School of Medicine, the oldest medical school in East Africa.

He holds a Bachelor of Medicine and Bachelor of Surgery degree and a Master of Science degree in Pharmacology, both awarded by Makerere University, in Uganda. His Doctor of Philosophy in Clinical Pharmacology was obtained from the University of Cape Town, in South Africa. He also holds a Postgraduate Diploma in Management, obtained from the Uganda Management Institute, in Kampala.

Career
For a period of ten years, he chaired the Department of Pharmacology and Therapeutics at Makerere University College of Health Sciences. He was then appointed Dean of Busitema University Faculty of Health Sciences, serving in that capacity from 2013 until 2019.

As Vice Chancellor at Busitema University, he succeeded Professor Mary Okwakol, the founding Vice Chancellor, whose term of office ended on 30 April 2019.

Family
Professor Waako is married to Engineer Ziria Tibalwa Waako, an electrical engineer, who serves as the chief executive officer of Uganda's Electricity Regulatory Authority, since November 2016. Together, they are parents to five children.

Other considerations
He has published extensively in the areas of traditional medicines, drug discovery and development, rational use of medicines, and medicine supply systems. He has over 50 publications in peer reviewed Journals to his name. He is a Senior Research Fellow at Queen Mary University of London. He is also a Fellow of the Uganda National Academy of Sciences. Some of the publications include; Prevalence and factors associated with traditional herbal medicine use among patients on highly active antiretroviral therapy in Uganda. The study found that prevalence of THM use among participants on HAART was high. Measuring adherence to antiretroviral treatment in resource-poor settings: The feasibility of collecting routine data for key indicators. The study evaluated the feasibility of collecting routine data to standardize adherence measurement using a draft set of indicators. Traditional treatment of malaria in Mbarara District, western Uganda. East African medicinal plants as a source of lead compounds for the development of new antimalarial drugs. A strategy to improve skills in pharmaceutical supply management in East Africa: the regional technical resource collaboration for pharmaceutical management. The study established that the ability of trained institutions to mobilize their own resources for skills-building activities is crucial for the success and sustainability of these programmes. Existing capacity to manage pharmaceuticals and related commodities in East Africa: an assessment with specific reference to antiretroviral therapy. Among others the study established that there is inadequate capacity for managing medicines and related commodities in East Africa. A comparison of prescribing practices between public and private sector physicians in Uganda. A novel polymorphism in ABCB1 gene, CYP2B6*6 and sex predict single-dose efavirenz population pharmacokinetics in Ugandans. Knowledge on plants used traditionally in the treatment of tuberculosis in Uganda. This study established that plant based therapies for treating TB were identified. Influence of efavirenz pharmacokinetics and pharmacogenetics on neuropsychological disorders in Ugandan HIV-positive patients with or without tuberculosis: a prospective cohort study. The study concluded that efavirenz related neuropsychiatric symptoms are common among Ugandan HIV patients receiving ART. The prevalence and severity of mental illnesses handled by traditional healers in two districts in Uganda. The anti-mycobacterial activity of Lantana camara a plant traditionally used to treat symptoms of tuberculosis in South-western Uganda. Factors predicting home storage of medicines in Northern Uganda. The study established that self-medication is common among individuals in households which keep drugs. Psychological distress and associated factors among the attendees of traditional healing practices in Jinja and Iganga districts, Eastern Uganda: a cross-sectional study. The study provided evidence that a substantial proportion of attendees of traditional healing practices suffer from psychological distress. Patterns and Predictors of Self-Medication in Northern Uganda. The in vitro and in vivo antimalarial activity of Cardiospermum halicacabum L. and Momordica foetida Schumch. Et Thonn. Medicinal plants used by traditional medicine practitioners for the treatment of HIV/AIDS and related conditions in Uganda. The study identified numerous medicinal plants for treatment of HIV/AIDS patients were identified in the four districts.

See also
 Francis Omaswa

References

Living people
1967 births
Ugandan pharmacologists
Makerere University alumni
University of Cape Town alumni
Uganda Management Institute alumni
Academic staff of Makerere University
Academic staff of Busitema University
Vice-chancellors of universities in Uganda
Fellows of Uganda National Academy of Sciences